Water Eaton House Bridge is a footbridge across the River Thames in Wiltshire, England. It straddles the parishes of Cricklade and Castle Eaton near Water Eaton House and is between the heart of both villages, Cricklade being a small town to many. It is on the Thames Path.

Former weir
There was an ancient weir owned by Water Eaton which was subject to a dispute with Godstow Priory in the 14th century, the position of which may be marked by the little kink in the mutual parish boundary (coming away from the river).

Manor
Water Eaton farmhouse, south-east, is a modern house on an ancient site, known in the 18th century as Nun Eaton. This old manor house of Water Eaton (a hamlet or farmstead of Castle Eaton) had a tradition attaching to it that it was a "house of mercy" connected with Godstow Abbey near Oxford.  Adjacent are remains of fishponds. Ornately carved stone was found in the ruins of the house.

See also
Crossings of the River Thames

References

Bridges across the River Thames
Bridges in Wiltshire